Raymond Abdo Hatim Baaklini (born 12 October 1943 at Bzebdine, Lebanon ) was the Lebanese ambassador to Canada until April 2007. He has a long history in serving the Lebanese diplomatic corp. He was an ambassador among others to France and Libya. He was born in Bzebdine, a village in Mount Lebanon.

He is part of a well known and old Maronite family descendant of the Kairouz and Helou families from the north of Lebanon.

In 2003, he made controversial comments suggesting that Jews or Zionists control 90% of Canadian media.
He died in his home country, Lebanon, in 2013.

External links
Embassy of Lebanon in Canada
Bzebdine: family tree of Raymond Baaklini

References

1943 births
Living people
Lebanese diplomats
Ambassadors of Lebanon to Canada
Ambassadors of Lebanon to France
Ambassadors of Lebanon to Libya